Marshall Park is a neighborhood in the Southwest section of Portland, Oregon. It gets its name from the adjacent Marshall Park donated to the City of Portland by Frederick C. and Addie Mae Marshall in 1948.  It borders Markham to the west and north, South Burlingame to the north, Collins View to the east, and Arnold Creek to the south.

Parks in the neighborhood include Jensen Natural Area (1996), Foley-Balmer Natural Area (1996) and Marshall Park (1948).

References

External links
 Marshall Park Neighborhood Association on the Southwest Neighborhoods, Inc. district coalition website
 Guide to Marshall Park Neighborhood (PortlandNeighborhood.com)

Neighborhoods in Portland, Oregon